The Tingzikou Dam is a gravity dam on the Jialing River downstream of Guangyuan in Cangxi County, Sichuan province, China. The purposes of the dam is flood control, irrigation, hydroelectric power production and navigation. The dam supports a 1,100 MW power station and a 500-ton ship lift. The project was approved in October 2009 and after being shelved for 50 years. Construction began soon thereafter and the river was closed-off in January 2010. The dam began to impound its reservoir in May 2013 and the first generator went online in August. On 20 March 2014 the third generator was commissioned and the fourth and final on 29 April 2014.

See also 

 List of power stations in China

References

Hydroelectric power stations in Sichuan
Dams completed in 2013
Dams in China
Energy infrastructure completed in 2014
Gravity dams
2014 establishments in China